Aleksandr Aleksandrovich Shibaev (born 18 April 1987) is a Russian former ice hockey centre. He mainly played in the Russian Supreme Hockey League, but also played in the Kontinental Hockey League for HC MVD, OHK Dynamo Moscow and Vityaz Podolsk.

References

External links
 

1987 births
Living people
Dynamo Balashikha players
HC Dynamo Moscow players
Kazzinc-Torpedo players
Kristall Elektrostal players
KRS Heilongjiang players
Krylya Sovetov Moscow players
Rubin Tyumen players
Russian ice hockey centres
HC MVD players
Ice hockey people from Moscow
Sputnik Nizhny Tagil players
Tsen Tou Jilin City players
THK Tver players
HC Vityaz players